Omar Antonio Malavé (17 January 1963 – 22 November 2021) was a Venezuelan professional baseball player, coach and manager.  The first base coach for the Toronto Blue Jays of Major League Baseball in 2010, Malavé spent the 2013 season as the coordinator of Latin American operations in Toronto's player development system. At the time of his death, Malavé was the manager of Mexican League team Algodoneros de Unión Laguna.

Career
Malavé played in the minor leagues for the Blue Jays from 1981 to 1989.  A versatile performer, he played every infield position as well as outfield, and hit .258 in 654 games played.

Malavé managed in the Blue Jays' minor league system from 1991–2009 and in 2011–2012.

On 13 January 2014, Malavé was named the manager of the Dunedin Blue Jays.

In January 2020, Malavé joined Algodoneros de Unión Laguna as the team's manager.

Death
Malavé died on November 22, 2021 in Dunedin, Florida. His daughter announced on Twitter that Malavé had ended his own life.

References

External links

Pelota Binaria (Venezuelan Winter League)

1963 births
2021 deaths
Baseball first basemen
Baseball shortstops
Baseball third basemen
Cardenales de Lara players
Caribbean Series managers
Dunedin Blue Jays players
Florence Blue Jays players
Gulf Coast Blue Jays players
Kinston Blue Jays players
Knoxville Blue Jays players
Major League Baseball first base coaches
Myrtle Beach Blue Jays players
People from Cumaná
Syracuse Chiefs managers
Toronto Blue Jays coaches
Venezuela national baseball team people
Venezuelan baseball coaches
Venezuelan expatriate baseball people in Canada
Venezuelan expatriate baseball players in the United States
Ventura County Gulls players
Suicides in Florida